is a passenger railway station located in the city of Iruma, Saitama, Japan, operated by the private railway operator Seibu Railway.

Lines

Station layout
The station consists of two ground-level side platforms serving two tracks, with an elevated station building.

Platforms

History
The station opened on 1 April 1926.

Station numbering was introduced on all Seibu Railway lines during fiscal 2012, with Musashi-Fujisawa Station becoming "SI21".

Passenger statistics
In fiscal 2019, the station was the 47th busiest on the Seibu network with an average of 24,182 passengers daily. The passenger figures for previous years are as shown below.

The passenger figures for previous years are as shown below.

Surrounding area

See also
 List of railway stations in Japan

References

External links

 Musashi-Fujisawa Station information (Seibu Railway) 
 Musashi-Fujisawa Station information (Saitama Prefectural Government) 

Railway stations in Saitama Prefecture
Railway stations in Japan opened in 1926
Seibu Ikebukuro Line
Iruma, Saitama